Arthur Lehman Goodhart  (1 March 1891 in New York City – 10 November 1978 in Oxford) was an American-born academic jurist and lawyer; he was Professor of Jurisprudence at the University of Oxford, 1931–51, when he was also a Fellow of University College, Oxford. He was the first American to be the Master of an Oxford college, and was a significant benefactor to the college.

Early life and education
Arthur Goodhart was born to a Jewish family in New York City, the youngest of three children born to Harriet "Hattie" (née Lehman) and Philip Julius Goodhart. His siblings were Howard Lehman Goodhart and Helen Goodhart Altschul (married to Frank Altschul). His maternal grandfather was Mayer Lehman, one of three brothers who co-founded the investment banking firm Lehman Brothers. Goodhart was educated at the Hotchkiss School, Yale University and Trinity College, Cambridge. At Yale, he was an editor of campus humor magazine The Yale Record. After returning to the United States, he practised law until World War I. Following the war, he started to pursue an academic career in law, initially at Cambridge University and later at Oxford University where he became Professor of Jurisprudence and subsequently the Master of University College. He was editor of the Law Quarterly Review for fifty years.

Career
Rejected for service with British forces in World War I, in 1914, Goodhart became a member of the U.S. forces when the U.S. joined the war in 1917; he became counsel to the U.S. mission to Poland, in 1919.

Goodhart was called to the bar by the Inner Temple 1919, and became a fellow of Corpus Christi College, Cambridge, and university lecturer in jurisprudence; he edited the Cambridge Law Journal, 1921–5, and the Law Quarterly Review, 1926. In 1931 he moved to Oxford to become professor of jurisprudence. He gave up that chair when he became Master of University College, Oxford, 1951–63. Subsequently, he was an Honorary Fellow of the college until his death in 1978. In 1952 he delivered the Hamlyn Lectures.

As a member of the Law Revision Committee, Goodhart helped to promote improvements in various branches of the law.

Personal life
Arthur Goodhart was married to Cecily Goodhart (née Carter), a devout Anglican. They had three children: Sir Philip Goodhart; William Goodhart, Lord Goodhart of Youlbury; and Charles Goodhart (after whom Goodhart's law is named).

Legacy
Students during Goodhart's Mastership of University College included Bob Hawke, matriculated 1953, who was later Prime Minister of Australia.

The Goodhart Quad and the Goodhart Building (to the east, overlooking the quad and used for student accommodation) at University College, Oxford, off Logic Lane, are named in his memory. The largest lecture theatre in the Sir David Williams Building, which houses the Faculty of Law at the University of Cambridge, is also named "The Arthur Goodhart Lecture Theatre" after him. Cecily's Court, a small open area containing a fountain, located between the Goodhart Building and 83–85 High Street, is named in memory of Goodhart's wife.

Honours and titles
 1938 Honorary bencher, Lincoln's Inn
 1943, King's Counsel
 1948, Honorary Knight Commander of the Order of the British Empire (KBE). As a US citizen, an honorary knighthood, and name not prefixed "Sir"
 1952, Fellow of the British Academy
 He received honorary degrees from twenty universities
 Honorary Fellow, Trinity College, Cambridge
 Honorary Fellow, University College, Oxford

References

Sources
 Concise Dictionary of National Biography.
 Who was Who.

External links
 

1891 births
1978 deaths
American legal scholars
English legal scholars
Members of Lincoln's Inn
20th-century American lawyers
American people of German-Jewish descent
English Jews
English people of German-Jewish descent
English philanthropists
Jewish American attorneys
Hotchkiss School alumni
Yale University alumni
Alumni of Trinity College, Cambridge
Fellows of Corpus Christi College, Cambridge
Fellows of Trinity College, Cambridge
Fellows of University College, Oxford
Masters of University College, Oxford
Academic journal editors
Honorary Knights Commander of the Order of the British Empire
Lawyers awarded knighthoods
Members of the Inner Temple
Professors of Jurisprudence (University of Oxford)
American emigrants to the United Kingdom
Lehman family
Fellows of the British Academy
British King's Counsel